Episode 100 may refer to:

 "Episode 100" (American Horror Story), an episode of American Horror Story: 1984
 "100" (Criminal Minds), an episode of Criminal Minds
 "100" (Fear the Walking Dead), an episode of Fear the Walking Dead
 "100" (Glee), an episode of Glee
 "100" (30 Rock), an episode of 30 Rock

See also
 100 episodes
 List of The 100 episodes